Condillac may refer to:

 Étienne Bonnot de Condillac (1715–1780), French philosopher
 Condillac, Drôme, a commune of the Drôme département in France